Kostyantyn Mykolayovych Dymarchuk (born 18 September 1977, in Donetsk) is a Ukrainian former football player.

External links
 

1977 births
Footballers from Donetsk
Living people
SC Odesa players
Ukrainian footballers
FC Zenit Saint Petersburg players
Ukrainian expatriate footballers
Expatriate footballers in Russia
Ukrainian expatriate sportspeople in Russia
Russian Premier League players
FC Tyumen players
FC Zhemchuzhina Sochi players
FC Akhmat Grozny players
FC Kristall Smolensk players
Association football defenders
FC Sever Murmansk players
FC Spartak Kostroma players
FC Zenit-2 Saint Petersburg players
FC Mashuk-KMV Pyatigorsk players